The 1912–13 Mississippi A&M Aggies basketball team represented Mississippi A&M College in the 1912–13 college basketball season.

References

Mississippi AandM
Mississippi State Bulldogs men's basketball seasons